Arlon Sterpenich Airfield  is a recreational aerodrome located east of Arlon, Luxembourg, Wallonia, Belgium, close to the border of the Grand Duchy of Luxembourg. Like most recreational airfields in Belgium, its use is subject to prior permission from the operator.
Only ultralight aircraft are accepted.

See also
 List of airports in Belgium

References

External links 
 Operator's website
 Airport record for EBAR at Landings.com

Airports in Luxembourg (Belgium)
Arlon